Don't Poke the Bear may refer to:

"Don't Poke the Bear", a song on the album Spooky Action
"Don't Poke the Bear", 3rd episode of Timber Creek Lodge
"Don't Poke the Bear", 4th episode of the second season of Summer House (2017 TV series)
"Don't Poke the Bear", 15th episode of the second season of Saving Hope

See also
Wikipedia:Don't poke the bear